TAAB may refer to:

Thick as a Brick, TAAB
Thick as a Brick 2 or TAAB2
Tasmanian Arts Advisory Board (TAAB), or Arts Tasmania, Australia